A microswimmer is a microscopic object with the ability to move in a fluid environment. Natural microswimmers are found everywhere in the natural world as biological microorganisms, such as bacteria, archaea, protists, sperm and microanimals. Since the turn of the millennium there has been increasing interest in manufacturing synthetic and biohybrid microswimmers. Although only two decades have passed since their emergence, they have already shown promise for various biomedical and environmental applications.

Given the recent nature of the field, there is yet no consensus in the literature for the nomenclature of the microscopic objects this article refers to as "microswimmers". Among the many alternative names such objects are given in the literature, microswimmers, micro/nanorobots and micro/nanomotors are likely the most frequently encountered. Other common terms may be more descriptive, including information about the object shape, e.g., microtube or microhelix, its components, e.g., biohybrid, spermbot, bacteriabot, or micro-bio-robot, or behavior, e.g., microrocket, microbullet, microtool or microroller. Researchers have also named their specific microswimmers e.g., medibots, hairbots, iMushbots, IRONSperm, teabots, biobots, T-budbots, or MOFBOTS.

Background
In 1828, the British biologist Robert Brown discovered the incessant jiggling motion of pollen in water and described his finding in his article "A Brief Account of Microscopical Observations…", leading to extended scientific discussion about the origin of this motion. This enigma was resolved only in 1905, when Albert Einstein published his celebrated essay Über die von der molekularkinetischen Theorie der Wärme geforderte Bewegung von in ruhenden Flüssigkeiten suspendierten Teilchen. Einstein not only deduced the diffusion of suspended particles in quiescent liquids, but also suggested these findings could be used to determine particle size — in a sense, he was the world's first microrheologist.

Ever since Newton established his equations of motion, the mystery of motion on the microscale has emerged frequently in scientific history, as famously demonstrated by a couple of articles that should be discussed briefly. First, an essential concept, popularized by Osborne Reynolds, is that the relative importance of inertia and viscosity for the motion of a fluid depends on certain details of the system under consideration. The Reynolds number , named in his honor, quantifies this comparison as a dimensionless ratio of characteristic inertial and viscous forces:

The overwhelming importance of viscosity for swimming at the micrometer scale has profound implications for swimming strategy. This has been discussed memorably by E. M. Purcell, who invited the reader into the world of microorganisms and theoretically studied the conditions of their motion. In the first place, propulsion strategies of large scale swimmers often involve imparting momentum to the surrounding fluid in periodic discrete events, such as vortex shedding, and coasting between these events through inertia. This cannot be effective for microscale swimmers like bacteria: due to the large viscous damping, the inertial coasting time of a micron-sized object is on the order of 1 μs. The coasting distance of a microorganism moving at a typical speed is about 0.1 angstroms (Å). Purcell concluded that only forces that are exerted in the present moment on a microscale body contribute to its propulsion, so a constant energy conversion method is essential.

Microorganisms have optimized their metabolism for continuous energy production, while purely artificial microswimmers (microrobots) must obtain energy from the environment, since their on-board-storage-capacity is very limited. As a further consequence of the continuous dissipation of energy, biological and artificial microswimmers do not obey the laws of equilibrium statistical physics, and need to be described by non-equilibrium dynamics. Mathematically, Purcell explored the implications of low Reynolds number by taking the Navier-Stokes equation and eliminating the inertial terms:

As Purcell noted, the resulting equation — the Stokes equation — contains no explicit time dependence. This has some important consequences for how a suspended body (e.g., a bacterium) can swim through periodic mechanical motions or deformations (e.g., of a flagellum). First, the rate of motion is practically irrelevant for the motion of the microswimmer and of the surrounding fluid: changing the rate of motion will change the scale of the velocities of the fluid and of the microswimmer, but it will not change the pattern of fluid flow. Secondly, reversing the direction of mechanical motion will simply reverse all velocities in the system. These properties of the Stokes equation severely restrict the range of feasible swimming strategies.

As a concrete illustration, consider a mathematical scallop that consists of two rigid pieces connected by a hinge. Can the "scallop" swim by periodically opening and closing the hinge? No: regardless of how the cycle of opening and closing depends on time, the scallop will always return to its starting point at the end of the cycle. Here originated the striking quote: "Fast or slow, it exactly retraces its trajectory and it's back where it started". In light of this scallop theorem, Purcell developed approaches concerning how artificial motion at the micro scale can be generated. This paper continues to inspire ongoing scientific discussion; for example, recent work by the Fischer group from the Max Planck Institute for Intelligent Systems experimentally confirmed that the scallop principle is only valid for Newtonian fluids.

Types
Different types of microswimmers are powered and actuated in different ways. Swimming strategies for individual microswimmers as well as swarms of microswimmers have been examined down through the years. Typically, microswimmers rely either on external power sources, as it is the case for magnetic, optic, or acoustic control, or employ the fuel available in their surroundings, as is the case with biohybrid or catalytic microswimmers. Magnetic and acoustic actuation are typically compatible with in vivo microswimmer manipulation and catalytic microswimmers can be specifically engineered to employ in vivo fuels. The use of optical forces in biological fluids or in vivo is more challenging, but interesting examples have nevertheless been demonstrated. 

Often, researchers choose to take inspiration from nature, either for the entire microswimmer design, or for achieving a desired propulsion type. For example, one of the first bioinspired microswimmers consisted of human red blood cells modified with a flagellum-like artificial component made of filaments of magnetic particles bonded via biotin–streptavidin interactions. More recently, biomimetic swimming inspired by worm-like travelling wave features, shrimp locomotion, and bacterial run-and-tumble motion, was demonstrated by using shaped light.  

A different nature-inspired approach is the use of biohybrid microswimmers. These comprise a living component and a synthetic one. Biohybrids most often take advantage of the microscale motion of various biological systems and can also make use of other behaviours characterising the living component. For magnetic bioinspired and biohybrid microswimmers, typical model organisms are bacteria, sperm cells and magnetotactic cells. In addition to the use of magnetic forces, actuation of bioinspired microswimmers was also demonstrated using e.g., acoustic excitation or optical forces. Another nature-inspired behavior related to optical forces is that of phototaxis, which can be exploited by e.g., cargo-carrying microorganisms, synthetic microswimmers or biohybrid microswimmers. A number of recent review papers are focused on explaining or comparing existing propulsion and control strategies used in microswimmer actuation. Magnetic actuation is most often included for controlled in vivo guiding, even for microswimmers which rely on a different type of propulsion. In 2020, Koleoso et al. reviewed the use of magnetic small scale robots for biomedical applications and provide details about the various magnetic fields and actuation systems developed for such purposes.

Strategies for the fabrication of microswimmers include two-photon polymerisation 3D printing, photolithography, template-assisted electrodeposition, or bonding of a living component to an inanimate one by exploiting different strategies. More recent approaches exploit 4D printing, which is the 3D printing of stimuli-responsive materials. Further functionalization is often required, either to enable a certain type of actuation, e.g., metal coating for magnetic control or thermoplasmonic responses, or as part of the application, if certain characteristics are required for e.g., sensing, cargo transport, controlled interactions with the environment, or biodegradation.

Natural microswimmers

Motile systems have developed in the natural world over time and length scales spanning several orders of magnitude, and have evolved anatomically and physiologically to attain optimal strategies for self-propulsion and overcome the implications of high viscosity forces and Brownian motion, as shown in the diagram on the right.

Some of the smallest known natural motile systems are motor proteins, i.e., proteins and protein complexes present in cells that carry out a variety of physiological functions by transducing chemical energy into mechanical energy. These motor proteins are classified as myosins, kinesins, or dyneins. Myosin motors are responsible for muscle contractions and the transport of cargousing actin filaments as tracks. Dynein motors and kinesin motors, on the other hand, use microtubules to transport vesicles across the cell. The mechanism these protein motors use to convert chemical energy into movement depends on ATP hydrolysis, which leads to a conformation modification in the globular motor domain, leading to directed motion.

Bacteria can be roughly divided into two fundamentally different groups, gram-positive and gram-negative bacteria, distinguished by the architecture of their cell envelope. In each case the cell envelope is a complex multi-layered structure that protects the cell from its environment. In gram-positive bacteria, the cytoplasmic membrane is only surrounded by a thick cell wall of peptidoglycan. By contrast, the envelope of gram-negative bacteria is more complex and consists (from inside to outside) of the cytoplasmic membrane, a thin layer of peptidoglycan, and an additional outer membrane, also called the lipopolysaccharide layer. Other bacterial cell surface structures range from disorganised slime layers to highly structured capsules. These are made from secreted slimy or sticky polysaccharides or proteins that provide protection for the cells and are in direct contact with the environment. They have other functions, including attachment to solid surfaces. Additionally, protein appendages can be present on the surface: fimbriae and pili can have different lengths and diameters and their functions include adhesion and twitching motility.

Specifically, for microorganisms that live in aqueous environments, locomotion refers to swimming, and hence the world is full of different classes of swimming microorganisms, such as bacteria, spermatozoa, protozoa, and algae. Bacteria move due to rotation of hair-like filaments called flagella, which are anchored to a protein motor complex on the bacteria cell wall.

The following table, based on Schwarz et al., 2017, lists some examples of natural or biological microswimmers.

Synthetic microswimmers

One of the current engineering challenges is to create miniaturised functional vehicles that can carry out complex tasks at a small scale that would be otherwise impractical, inefficient, or outright impossible by conventional means. These vehicles are termed nano/micromotors or nano/microrobots, and should be distinguished from even smaller molecular machines for energy, computing, or other applications on the one side and static microelectromechanical systems (MEMS) on the other side of this size scale. Rather than being electronic devices on a chip, micromotors are able to move freely through a liquid medium while being steered or directed externally or by intrinsic design, which can be achieved by various mechanisms, most importantly catalytic reactions, magnetic fields, or ultrasonic waves. 

There are a variety of sensing, actuating, or pickup-and-delivery applications that scientists are currently aiming for, with local drug targeting for cancer treatment being one of the more prominent examples. For applications like this, a micromotor needs to be able to move, i.e., to swim, freely in three dimensions efficiently controlled and directed with a reliable mechanism.

It is a direct consequence of the small size scale of microswimmers that they have a low Reynolds number. This means the physics of how microswimmers swim is dominated by viscous drag forces, a problem which has been discussed extensively by physicists in the field. This kind of swimming has challenged engineers as it is not commonly experienced in everyday life, but can nonetheless be observed in nature for motile microorganisms like sperm or certain bacteria. Naturally, these microorganisms served as inspiration from the very beginning to create artificial micromotors, as they were able to tackle the challenges that an active, self-sufficient microswimmer vehicle has to face. With biomimetic approaches, researchers were able to imitate the flagella-based motion strategy of sperm and Escherichia coli bacteria by reproducing their respective flagellum shape and actuating it with magnetic fields.

Microorganisms have adapted their locomotion to the harsh environment of low Reynolds number regime by invoking different swimming strategy. For example, the E. coli moves by rotating its helical flagellum, Chlamydomonas flagella have a breaststroke kind of motion. African trypanosome has a helical flagellum attached to the cell body with a planar wave passing through it. Swimming of these kind of natural swimmers have been investigated for the last half-century. As a result of these studies, artificial swimmers have also been proposed, like Taylor sheet, Purcell's two-hinge swimmer, three-linked spheres swimmer, elastic two-sphere swimmer and three-sphere with a passive elastic arm, which have further enhanced understanding about low Reynolds number swimmers. One of the challenges in proposing an artificial swimmer lies in the fact that the proposed movement stroke should not be reciprocal otherwise it cannot propel itself due to the Scallop theorem. In Scallop theorem, Purcell had argued that a swimmer with one-hinge or one degree of freedom is bound to perform reciprocal motion and thus will not be able to swim in the Stokes regime.

Purcell proposed two possible ways to elude from Scallop theorem, one is 'corkscrew' motion and the other is 'flexible oar' motion. Using the concept of flexible oar, Dreyfus et al reported a micro swimmer that exploit elastic property of a slender filament made up of paramagnetic beads. To break the time inversion symmetry, a passive head was attached to the flexible arm. The passive head reduces the velocity of the flexible swimmer, bigger the head, higher is the drag force experienced by the swimmer. The head is essential for swimming because without it the tail performs a reciprocal motion and the velocity of the swimmer reduces to zero.

Responding to stimuli

Reconfigurable synthetic or artificial microswimmers need internal feedback Self-propelling microparticles are often proposed as synthetic models for biological microswimmers, yet they lack the internally regulated adaptation of their biological counterparts. Conversely, adaptation can be encoded in larger-scale soft-robotic devices but remains elusive to transfer to the colloidal scale.

The ubiquity and success of motile bacteria are strongly coupled to their ability to autonomously adapt to different environments as they can reconfigure their shape, metabolism, and motility via internal feedback mechanisms. Realizing artificial microswimmers with similar adaptation capabilities and autonomous behavior might substantially impact technologies ranging from optimal transport to sensing and microrobotics. Focusing on adaptation, existing approaches at the colloidal scale mostly rely on external feedback, either to regulate motility via the spatiotemporal modulation of the propulsion velocity and direction or to induce shape changes via the same magnetic or electric fields, which are also driving the particles. On the contrary, endowing artificial microswimmers with an internal feedback mechanism, which regulates motility in response to stimuli that are decoupled from the source of propulsion, remains an elusive task.

A promising route to achieve this goal is to exploit the coupling between particle shape and motility. Efficient switching between different propulsion states can, for instance, be reached by the spontaneous aggregation of symmetry-breaking active clusters of varying geometry, albeit this process does not have the desired deterministic control. Conversely, designing colloidal clusters with fixed shapes and compositions offers fine control on motility but lacks adaptation. Although progress on reconfigurable robots at the sub-millimeter scale has been made, downscaling these concepts to the colloidal level demands alternative fabrication and design. Shape-shifting colloidal clusters reconfiguring along a predefined pathway in response to local stimuli would combine both characteristics, with high potential toward the vision of realising adaptive artificial microswimmers.

Biohybrid microswimmers

The so-called biohybrid microswimmer can be defined as a microswimmer that consist of both biological and artificial parts, for instance, one or several living microorganisms attached to one or various synthetic parts. The biohybrid approach directly employs living microorganisms to be a main component or modified base of a functional microswimmer. Initially microorganisms were used as the motor units for artificial devices, but in recent years this role has been extended and modified toward other functionalities that take advantage of the biological capabilities of these organisms considering their means of interacting with other cells and living matter, specifically for applications inside the human body like drug delivery or fertilisation.

A distinct advantage of microorganisms is that they naturally integrate motility and various biological functions in a conveniently miniaturised package, coupled with autonomous sensing and decision-making capabilities. They are able to adapt and thrive in complex in vivo environments and are capable of self-repair and self-assembly upon interaction with their surroundings. In that sense, self-sufficient microorganisms naturally function very similar to what we envision for artificially created microrobots: They harvest chemical energy from their surroundings to power molecular motor proteins that serve as actuators, they employ ion channels and microtubular networks to act as intracellular wiring, they rely on RNA or DNA as memory for control algorithms, and they feature an array of various membrane proteins to sense and evaluate their surroundings. All these abilities act together to allow microbes to thrive and pursue their goal and function. In principle, these abilities also qualify them as biological microrobots for novel operations like theranostics, the combination of diagnosis and therapy, if we are able to impose such functions artificially, for example, by functionalisation with therapeutics. Further, artificial extensions may be used as handles for external control and supervision mechanisms or to enhance the microbe's performance to guide and tailor its functions for specific applications.

In fact, the biohybrid approach can be conceived in a dualistic way, with respect to the three basic ingredients of an in vivo microrobot, which are motility, control, and functionality. Figure 1 illustrates how these three ingredients can be either realized biologically, i.e., by the microorganism, or artificially, i.e., by the synthetic component. For example, a hybrid biomicromotor based on a sperm cell can be driven by the flagellum of the sperm or by an attached artificial helical flagellum. It can orient itself autonomously via biological interactions with its surroundings and other cells, or be controlled and supervised externally via artificial sensors and actuators. Finally, it can carry out a biological function, like its inherent ability to fertilize an egg cell, or an artificially imposed function, like the delivery of synthetic drugs or DNA vectors. A biohybrid device may deploy any feasible combination of such biological and artificial components in order to carry out a specific application.

Navigation
Hydrodynamics can determine the optimal route for microswimmer navigation Compared to the well explored problem of how to steer a macroscopic agent, like an airplane or a moon lander, to optimally reach a target, optimal navigation strategies for microswimmers experiencing hydrodynamic interactions with walls and obstacles are far-less understood. The quest on how to navigate or steer to optimally reach a target is important, e.g., for airplanes to save fuel while facing complex wind patterns on their way to a remote destination, or for the coordination of the motion of the parts of a space-agent to safely land on the moon. These classical problems are well-explored and are usually solved using optimal control theory. Likewise, navigation and search strategies are frequently encountered in a plethora of biological systems, including the foraging of animals for food, or of T cells searching for targets to mount an immune response. 

There is growing interest in optimal navigation problems and search strategies of microswimmers and "dry" active Brownian particles, The general problem regarding the optimal trajectory of a microswimmer which can freely steer but cannot control its speed toward a predefined target (point-to-point navigation) can be referred to as "the optimal microswimmer navigation problem". The characteristic differences between the optimal microswimmer navigation problem and conventional optimal control problems for macroagents like airplanes, cruise-ships, or moon-landers root in the presence of a low-Reynolds-number solvent in the former problem only. They comprise (i) overdamped dynamics, (ii) thermal fluctuations, and (iii) long-ranged fluid-mediated hydrodynamic interactions with interfaces, walls, and obstacles, all of which are characteristic for microswimmers. In particular, the non-conservative hydrodynamic forces which microswimmers experience call for a distinct navigation strategy than the conservative gravitational forces acting, e.g. on space vehicles. Recent work has explored optimal navigation problems of dry active particles (and particles in external flow fields) accounting for (i) and partly also for (ii). Specifically recent research has pioneered the use of reinforcement learning such as determining optimal steering strategies of active particles to optimally navigate toward a target position or to exploit external flow fields to avoid getting trapped in certain flow structures by learning smart gravitaxis. Deep reinforcement learning has been used to explore microswimmer navigation problems in mazes and obstacle arrays assuming global or only local knowledge of the environment. Analytical approaches to optimal active particle navigation complement these works and allow testing machine-learned results.

Applications
As is the case for microtechnology and nanotechnology in general, the history of microswimmer applications arguably starts with Richard Feynman’s famous lecture There's Plenty of Room at the Bottom. In the visionary speech, among other topics, Feynman addressed the idea of microscopic surgeons, saying: "...it would be interesting in surgery if you could swallow the surgeon. You put the mechanical surgeon inside the blood vessel and it goes into the heart and <<looks>> around (of course the information has to be fed out). It finds out which valve is the faulty one and takes a little knife and slices it out. Other small machines might be permanently incorporated in the body to assist some inadequately-functioning organ." The concept of the surgeon one could swallow was soon after presented in the science-fiction movie Fantastic Voyage and in Isaac Asimov’s writings.

Only a few decades later, microswimmers aiming to become true microscale surgeons evolved from an intriguing science-fiction concept to a reality explored in many research laboratories around the world, as already highlighted by Metin Sitti in 2009. These active agents that can self-propel in a low Reynolds number environment might play a key role in the future of nanomedicine, as popularised in 2016 by Yuval Noah Harari in Homo Deus: A Brief History of Tomorrow. In particular, they might become useful for the targeted delivery of genes or drugs and other cargo to a certain target (e.g. a cancer cell) through our blood vessels, requiring them to find a good, or ideally optimal, path toward the target avoiding, e.g., obstacles and unfortunate flow field regions.
 
Already in 2010, Nelson et al. reviewed the existing and envisioned applications of microrobots in minimally invasive medicine. Since then, the field has grown, and it has become clear that microswimmers have much potential for biomedical applications. Already, many interesting tasks can be performed in vitro using tailored microswimmers. Still, as of 2020, a number of challenges regarding in vivo control, biocompatibility and long-term biosafety need to be overcome before microswimmers can become a viable option for many clinical applications.

A schematic representation of the classification of biomedical applications is shown in the diagram on the left below. This includes the use of microswimmers for cargo transport in drug delivery and other biomedical applications, as well as assisted fertilisation, sensing, micromanipulation and imaging. Some of the more complex microswimmers fit into multiple categories, as they are applied simultaneously for e.g., sensing and drug delivery.

The design of an untethered microscopic mobile machine or microrobot to function in vivo with medical interventional capabilities should assume an integrated approach where design 3D body shape, material composition, manufacturing technique, deployment strategy, actuation and control methods, imaging modality, permeation of biological barriers, and the execution of the prescribed medical tasks need to be considered altogether, as illustrated in the diagram on the right above. Each of these essential aspects contains a special design consideration, which must be reflected at the physical design of the microrobot.

See also
 Bioinspiration
 Bio-inspired robotics
 Bio-inspired engineering
 Gray goo
 Robotic sperm
 Soft robotics
 Squirmer

References